Malcolm Alindajao Tuñacao (born December 8, 1977 in Cambaro, Mandaue City, Philippines) is a professional southpaw boxer in the flyweight division. He is a former WBC and lineal flyweight champion.

Fight career 
Tuñacao was a several time national champion in the amateur ranks while he was still under the careful watch of the eminent ALA Boxing Club. Poverty, however, compelled the Cebuano southpaw, a father of three, to venture into the pro arena, hoping to earn considerable money to sustain the daily living of his family.

On August 1, 1998, Tuñacao, known as "Eagle Eye", officially turned pro along with current WBC ranked #5 and then Filipino super featherweight champion Randy Suico and OPBF welterweight king Rev Santillan. They were then monickered as "The Golden Boys of Cebu Boxing". Tuñacao wrested the Filipino flyweight crown with a 12-round unanimous decision win over Rio Sumampong on September 25, 1998 in Talisay City. In 2000, he became the Lineal and WBC flyweight champion with a 7th round TKO win over Medgoen Singsurat of Thailand. The following year, he lost the titles to Pongsaklek Wonjongkam via a TKO in the 1st round.

He lost to Shinsuke Yamanaka via knockout in the twelfth round with the WBC Bantamweight title on the line on April 8, 2013.

Personal
As of August 2020, Malcolm has relocated to Japan with intentions to stay there permanently after he got together with a Japanese woman.

Professional boxing record

See also 
 List of flyweight boxing champions
 List of WBC world champions
 List of Filipino boxing world champions

References

External links 
 
 Malcolm Tuñacao - CBZ Profile

1977 births
Flyweight boxers
Living people
World Boxing Council champions
World flyweight boxing champions
World boxing champions
Filipino male boxers
People from Mandaue
Boxers from Cebu